The Hoogovens Wijk aan Zee Steel Chess Tournament 1990 was the 52nd edition of the Wijk aan Zee Chess Tournament. It was held in Wijk aan Zee in January 1990 and was won by John Nunn.

{| class="wikitable" style="text-align: center;"
|+ 52nd Hoogovens tournament, group A, 12–28 January 1990, Wijk aan Zee, Netherlands, Category XIII (2567)
! !! Player !! Rating !! 1 !! 2 !! 3 !! 4 !! 5 !! 6 !! 7 !! 8 !! 9 !! 10 !! 11 !! 12 !! 13 !! 14 !! Total !! TPR !! Place
|-
|-style="background:#ccffcc;"
| 1 || align=left| || 2600 ||  || ½ || ½ || ½ || ½ || 1 || 0 || 1 || 0 || 1 || ½ || 1 || 1 || ½ || 8 || 2651 || 1
|-
| 2 || align="left" | || 2605 || ½ ||  || ½ || ½ || ½ || 1 || ½ || ½ || 1 || 1 || ½ || ½ || 0 || ½ || 7½ || 2621 || 2–3
|-
| 3 || align="left" | || 2630 || ½ || ½ ||  || ½ || ½ || ½ || ½ || 0 || ½ || ½ || 1 || ½ || 1 || 1 || 7½ || 2619 || 2–3
|-
| 4 || align="left" | || 2645 || ½ || ½ || ½ ||  || ½ || ½ || ½ || 0 || 1 || ½ || 1 || ½ || ½ || ½ || 7 || 2590 || 4–6
|-
| 5 || align="left" | || 2555 || ½ || ½ || ½ || ½ ||  || ½ || ½ || ½ || ½ || ½ || ½ || ½ || ½ || 1 || 7 || 2597 || 4–6
|-
| 6 || align="left" | || 2525 || 0 || 0 || ½ || ½ || ½ ||  || ½ || 1 || ½ || ½ || ½ || 1 || ½ || 1 || 7 || 2599 || 4–6
|-
| 7 || align="left" | || 2540 || 1 || ½ || ½ || ½ || ½ || ½ ||  || ½ || ½ || ½ || ½ || 0 || 0 || 1 || 6½ || 2569 || 7–10
|-
| 8 || align="left" | || 2635 || 0 || ½ || 1 || 1 || ½ || 0 || ½ ||  || ½ || 1 || 0 || ½ || 1 || 0 || 6½ || 2562 || 7–10
|-
| 9 || align="left" | || 2625 || 1 || 0 || ½ || 0 || ½ || ½ || ½ || ½ ||  || ½ || ½ || 1 || 1 || 0 || 6½ || 2562 || 7–10
|-
| 10 || align="left" | || 2555 || 0 || 0 || ½ || ½ || ½ || ½ || ½ || 0 || ½ ||  || 1 || ½ || 1 || 1 || 6½ || 2568 || 7–10
|-
| 11 || align="left" | || 2550 || ½ || ½ || 0 || 0 || ½ || ½ || ½ || 1 || ½ || 0 ||  || ½ || ½ || 1 || 6 || 2539 || 11–12
|- 
| 12 || align="left" | || 2495 || 0 || ½ || ½ || ½ || ½ || 0 || 1 || ½ || 0 || ½ || ½ ||  || ½ || 1 || 6 || 2543 || 11–12
|-
| 13 || align="left" | || 2490 || 0 || 1 || 0 || ½ || ½ || ½ || 1 || 0 || 0 || 0 || ½ || ½ ||  || ½ || 5 || 2486 || 13
|-
| 14 || align="left" | || 2485 || ½ || ½ || 0 || ½ || 0 || 0 || 0 || 1 || 1 || 0 || 0 || 0 || ½ ||  || 4 || 2432 || 14
|}

References

Tata Steel Chess Tournament
1990 in chess
1990 in Dutch sport